The FIBA Under-19 Women's Basketball World Cup Most Valuable Player is a bi-annual award, that is given by FIBA, to the Most Valuable Player of the FIBA Under-19 Women's Basketball World Cup.

Winners

References

Most Valuable Player
Basketball trophies and awards